Blood from the Mummy's Tomb is a 1971 British horror film starring Andrew Keir, Valerie Leon, and James Villiers. It was director Seth Holt's final film, and was loosely adapted from Bram Stoker's 1903 novel The Jewel of Seven Stars. The film was released as the support feature to Dr. Jekyll and Sister Hyde.

Besides providing a rare leading role for Valerie Leon, the film is notable for its troubled production.

Plot
An expedition led by Professor Fuchs (Keir) locates the unmarked tomb of Tera (Leon) an evil Egyptian queen. A cabal of priests drugged her into a state of suspended animation and buried all of her evil relics with her. Fuchs is obsessed with Tera and takes her mummy and sarcophagus back to England, where he secretly recreates her tomb under his house. Four days "before her birthday", his daughter Margaret (also Leon) - who bears an uncanny resemblance to Tera and was born at the instant they recited her name - has recurring nightmares. Fuchs gives her the old queen's ring and tells her to "wear it always". Of course, this only makes matters worse. Queen Tera's evil power begins to tempt Margaret, as she learns how she's feared by her father's former colleagues.

Margaret notices a man lurking in the vacant building across the street. He is Corbeck (Villiers), an expedition member who's now her father's rival. Corbeck wants to restore Tera to life and he persuades Margaret to help him gather the missing relics. The problem is, each time one is given up the person who'd held it dies. When they have all the relics, Corbeck, Margaret and Fuchs begin the ancient ritual to reawaken Tera. At the last moment Fuchs learns that the queen's revival will mean Margaret's death. Together Fuchs and Margaret overpower and kill Corbeck, as the house quakes above them. Queen Tera awakens and kills Fuchs, but not before Margaret stabs her. Margaret and Tera are grappling over an ancient dagger when the house finally collapses on them.

Later in the hospital, a woman's face is wrapped in bandages. She's the sole survivor, and that all the others in the Professor's basement were "crushed beyond recognition". The bandaged woman slowly opens her eyes and struggles to speak, leaving the film scene ambiguous as to whether she is Margaret Fuchs or Queen Tera.

Cast

Production

Development
Writer Chris Wicking said the film was one of the last projects that James Carreras brought to Hammer. Wicking wanted to use the title of the book but Carreras did not. They brainstormed titles and came up with Blood from the Mummy's Tomb which Wicking thought they would never use but they did.

The job of directing went to Seth Holt, whose films were admired by producer Howard Brandy. Holt had a strong critical reputation for making such films as The Nanny but had not made a movie in two years. As Holt said in 1971: "I haven't been directing because I haven't been offered anything to direct".

Wicking worked with Seth Holt on the script. The film had to go into production early because there was a gap in the production schedule. Wicking said he had a falling out with producer Howard Brandy and was barred from the set but he continued to work with Holt in the evenings.

Shooting
Peter Cushing was cast in the film and completed one day's filming before leaving the production after his wife was diagnosed with emphysema. Cushing was replaced by Andrew Keir. The R1 DVD of the film released in the United States by Anchor Bay Entertainment contains still photographs of Cushing's day on the production.

Director Seth Holt died of a heart attack five weeks into the six-week shoot, collapsing into cast member Aubrey Morris's arms and dying on set. Michael Carreras directed the final week's filming. He said Holt's footage did not cut together.

According to the book Hammer, House of Horror: Behind the Screams by Howard Maxford, the budget for the film was £200,000. The film was shot at Elstree Studios in Hertfordshire.

Release
In January 1972 AIP bought the US distribution rights.

Critical reception 
AllMovie's review of the film was favourable, commending its "glamorous style" and "creepy atmosphere". Empire magazine gave it 3 out of 5.

The New York Times called it "tremendous fun, skilful and wonderfully energetic". Variety called it "polished and well-acted but rather tame".

See also
 The Awakening (1980) - another film based on The Jewel of Seven Stars

References

External links

 
 
 
 

1971 films
1971 horror films
1970s fantasy films
1970s supernatural horror films
Films shot at EMI-Elstree Studios
Films based on horror novels
Films based on works by Bram Stoker
Films directed by Michael Carreras
Films directed by Seth Holt
Films set in London
Mummy films
Hammer Film Productions horror films
American International Pictures films
Films based on Irish novels
Films set in Egypt
Films about spirit possession
British supernatural horror films
EMI Films films
1970s English-language films
1970s British films